Darya Aleksandrovna Dugina (15 December 1992 – 20 August 2022), also known under the pen name Daria Platonova, was a Russian journalist, political scientist and activist.

She was the daughter of Aleksandr Dugin, a supporter of Vladimir Putin and a far-right political philosopher, whose support for Russian invasion of Ukraine she shared.

She was killed in August 2022 in a car bombing on the outskirts of Moscow.

Early life and education 
Darya Dugina was born on 15 December 1992 in Moscow, Russia. She was the daughter of Aleksandr Dugin and his second wife, philosopher Natalya Melentyeva. In 2012/2013, while studying at Moscow State University, she was an intern at Bordeaux Montaigne University, specializing in Ancient Greek philosophy. Her MSU degree "focused on the political philosophy of late Neo-Platonism".

Career and activism 
After university, she worked as a journalist, writing for the state-controlled media outlet RT and the pro-Kremlin conservative channel Tsargrad, using the pen name Daria Platonova. She was affiliated with the International Eurasian Movement, and worked for them as a political commentator.

According to the United States Department of the Treasury, which added her to the Specially Designated Nationals and Blocked Persons List on 3 March 2022, she was the chief editor of a disinformation website called United World International which states it is owned by Putin ally Yevgeny Prigozhin, who also controls the state-backed Wagner Group. At the same time, she served as a press secretary of her father.

2022 Russian invasion of Ukraine 
Dugina was an outspoken supporter of the 2022 Russian invasion of Ukraine. In particular, she claimed that the war crimes against Ukrainian civilians by the Russian army during the invasion were staged. She mentioned that the war in Ukraine "serves to break the bridges of interaction between Russia and Europe, a struggle between two worldviews." In June 2022, she visited occupied Donetsk and Mariupol.

Dugina visited the Azovstal plant in Mariupol, where she collaborated with British journalist Graham Phillips, who also worked for Russian state media. On 4 July 2022, she was sanctioned by the British government, which accused her of being a "frequent and high-profile contributor of disinformation in relation to Ukraine and the Russian invasion of Ukraine on various online platforms." She responded by saying that she is an ordinary journalist and should not have been sanctioned.

Killing 

Dugina was killed on 20 August 2022, when her car exploded on Mozhayskoye Highway in the settlement of Bolshiye Vyazyomy outside Moscow around 9:45 p.m. local time. She was driving to Moscow after attending the annual festival "Tradition," which describes itself as a family festival for art lovers.

Investigators said an explosive device was attached to the underside of the car.

It is unclear whether she was targeted deliberately, or whether her father, who had been expected to travel with her but switched to another car at the last minute, was the intended target, or whether the intention might have been to kill both.

Claim of responsibility from National Republican Army 

Ilya Ponomarev, a former member of Russia's State Duma now living in exile in Ukraine, claimed that a Russian partisan group was responsible for the attack, and that the hitherto unknown group calls itself National Republican Army (NRA). Ponomarev claims the NRA is an underground group working inside Russia, dedicated to removing Putin from power. He has subsequently claimed it is a "network" of clandestine cells.

In Ponomarev's narrative to the Kyiv Post, the group has previously carried out anonymous arson attacks on military induction centers, then shifted to targeting Dugin and Dugina as "something high-profile for which they could become well known." He elaborated that a contact in the group told him a week before the assassination to expect "something big," followed by instructions on the day of the event to "watch the news." Following news coverage of the assassination, Ponomarev claims that he was provided evidence of the group's responsibility.

Ponomarev added that his sources believed two persons (i.e., both Dugin and Dugina) were in the targeted car. From Ponomarev's statement, it is unclear whether she was targeted deliberately, or whether her father was the intended target, or whether the intention might have been to kill both.<ref>{{cite web |url=Ex-MP Ilya Ponomarev confirms existence of The National Republican Army on February Morning TV (Rus) |title=Ex-MP Ilya Ponomarev confirms existence of The National Republican Army on February Morning TV (Rus) (see 3'23) |work=www.youtube.com |date=22 August 2022 |access-date=23 August 2022}}</ref> Ponomarev gave a similar account to Radio NV, adding that his contacts "sent certain photos to prove their involvement."

Along with the claim of responsibility for the assassination, Ponomarev aired the organization's manifesto on his media outlet "February Morning" and hailed it as "a new page in Russian resistance to Putinism. New—but not the last."

Later confronted with the news of the FSB's accusation, Ilya Ponomarev told the Meduza news outlet that his purported sources in the National Republican Army deny the claimed Ukrainian being the perpetrator while leaving ambiguous whether she may have had a role. In both Meduza and a message to his Telegram channel "Rospartisan", Ponomarev appeared to take credit for her exfiltration from Russia at the request of unnamed "friends."

Following his announcement of support for the assassination and the NRA, Ponomarev claims to have been disinvited from a planned meeting of Russian dissidents.

 Scepticism 
, Associated Press and The Guardian articles concerning the death of Dugina and its aftermath state that the claim of a National Republican Army responsibility cannot be confirmed. A 22 August 2022 report from Reuters says that "Ponomarev's assertion and the group's existence could not be independently verified."

In an interview with Ponomarev for Meduza, both the interviewer Svetlana Reiter and the editor note skepticism about his claims about the Russian NRA, his accommodations of Putin in his Duma career, and the source of his wealth. Separately, Meduza managing editor Kevin Rothrock questioned Ponomarev's integrity, the existence of the NRA, and implied that both Dugin and Dugina were "civilians" who should not have been targeted.

Citing the livestream of Yulia Latynina, Cathy Young discussed the possibility that Ponomarev is a "a grifter trying to sell a good story," but said that the NRA manifesto's appeal to patriotism is not suggestive of black propaganda.

Sergey S. Radchenko, a professor at the Henry A. Kissinger Center for Global Affairs at the Johns Hopkins School of Advanced International Studies, told Deutsche Welle he found the claim of responsibility and manifesto to both be "dodgy."

Deutsche Welle's reporter in Kyiv Roman Goncharenko said, "there are more questions than answers" about the group, and noted that the group's purported manifesto employs a call to action "fight like us, fight with us, fight better than us!" inspired by the Deutscher Fernsehfunk children's television show  that aired in both East Germany and the Soviet Union until 1991.

Matthew Sussex of Australian National University's National Security College wrote that "very few observers believe the hitherto-unknown National Republican Army, which claimed responsibility for the killing, was to blame. But if it were, then it points to the real possibility of organised domestic terrorism in Russia."

In The New Yorker, Masha Gessen mused that "either the National Republican Army is a new group using terrorist tactics, and it killed Dugina to show what it's capable of; or this is, in effect, a marketing move, a rush to take credit. In either case—whether the National Republican Army is real or fictional—this version is probably inching closer to the truth."

 Investigation 

On 22 August, the Russian Federal Security Service (FSB) claimed that Ukrainian special services were behind the killing, alleging that their primary suspect was a middle-aged female Ukrainian national who escaped to Estonia after the explosion.

According to the FSB, after arriving with her daughter in Russia the previous month the Ukrainian rented an apartment in the same building where Dugina lived, and both were present at the same festival Dugina attended before she was killed.

The FSB also released surveillance footage purportedly showing the suspect from cameras at the entrance of the apartment building and at the border crossing points, saying that she drove a Mini Cooper. The FSB allege she used a license plate from the Donetsk People's Republic, then switched to a plate from Kazakhstan and then used a plate from Ukraine to cross the border to Estonia.

Interfax later reported that the FSB named an accomplice, a middle-aged male Ukrainian national, as providing logistical assistance to the primary assassin. Specifically, the FSB alleged that the accomplice provided the primary suspect with their false license plates and a Kazakhstani passport, and assisted in bomb assembly while in Russia. The FSB further alleged that the accomplice had also escaped to Estonia. The name of the second alleged accomplice was released by FSB on 29 August 2022.

The later Interfax report elaborated that the FSB assert that the primary assassin tailed Dugina within the parking lot for guests at the "Tradition," followed Dugina's Land Cruiser in her own Mini Cooper, and detonated the bomb via remote control.

It has been impossible to independently verify any of the claims made by the FSB as Russia has criminalized disagreement with the official narrative of the killing and the war in Ukraine in general, and has shut down all non-Kremlin approved reporting.

 Ukrainian government response 
The Ukrainian government denied any involvement, with Ukrainian presidential advisor Mykhailo Podolyak stating that "we are not a criminal state like the Russian Federation, much less a terrorist one" and later blaming the killing on infighting between Russian security agencies.

While refusing to give comment on the assassination itself, the spokesman for the Chief Directorate of Intelligence of the Ministry of Defence of Ukraine told The Washington Post that "I can say that the process of internal destruction of the 'Russky Mir,' or 'the Russian world,' has begun," and predicted that "the Russian world will eat and devour itself from the inside."

 Estonian government response 
The Minister of Foreign Affairs for Estonia, Urmas Reinsalu, said that the claim that Dugina's assassin fled to safe harbor in Estonia was "[one] provocation in a very long line of provocations by the Russian Federation" and rejected the claim that Dugina's alleged killer had fled to Estonia. Reinsalu and the Ministry urged Estonians to avoid travel to Russia, and advised those on short term travel in Russia to hasten their exit.

In statements to The New York Times, law enforcement in Estonia said that Russia had not requested their assistance.

 US intelligence assessment 
On 5 October 2022, The New York Times reported a statement from an anonymous source that US intelligence agencies believed that certain "elements" of the Ukrainian government authorized the killing, with some officials believing that Aleksandr Dugin was the intended target. According to an assessment by the United States Intelligence Community reported by The New York Times on 5 October 2022, officials believe that parts of the Ukrainian government authorized the killing, with some US officials suspecting that Aleksandr Dugin was the intended target with Darya Dugina also being in the car. American officials also admonished Ukrainian officials over the killing, it reported, and that they were not aware of the operation.

Russian reaction
On 21 August 2022, exiled former parliamentarian Ilya Ponomarev, via services read aloud a manifesto of the National Republican Army (NRA) calling for armed action against the regime and endorsed both the assassination and the manifesto.

The following day, the anti-Putin exile group the Russian Action Committee blacklisted Ponomarev from attending the Free Russia Congress on grounds that he had "called for terrorist attacks on Russian territory." The committee's statement also implied that Dugina was a "civilian" who "did not take part in the armed confrontation," and similarly condemned the mockery of Alexandr Dugin following the attack as "a demonstrative rejection of normal human empathy for the families of the victims."

Dugina's father, Aleksandr Dugin, called the killing a "terrorist act executed by the Nazi Ukrainian regime" and wrote that "we need only our victory."

Russian president Vladimir Putin sent a message of condolences to the family of Dugina, describing her as a "bright, talented person with a real Russian heart." Putin posthumously awarded Dugina the Order of Courage.

The head of the Kremlin-recognized breakaway Donetsk People's Republic, Denis Pushilin, claimed that Ukrainian authorities were behind the explosion.

In the immediate aftermath of the assassination, the United States-government backed Ukrainian news service Svoboda.org gathered various perspectives from Russian-language social media.

The same compilation included responses from opponents and critics of Putin. Dmitry Gudkov wrote of the event as a "boomerang" for Dugin's warlike rhetoric. Maria Baronova observed that since the outbreak of the "special military operation" assassinations were shifting from cloaked poisonings back to openly violent means, and recalled wry advice from the 1990s to avoid expensive cars. Grigorii Golosov theorized that the attack was meant for Darya Dugina (and not her father) to provide an appealing martyr for anti-Ukraine hawks, though he stressed that he would refrain from guessing whom these hawks are. Alexander Nevzorov wrote that neither Dugin nor Dugina were important, but noted the assassination had created fear among Putin's circles.

 International reaction 
On 23 August, United Nations spokesperson Stéphane Dujarric called for an investigation into Dugina's killing.

Pope Francis condemned the killing of Darya Dugina and mentioned it as an example of the "madness of war," called Dugina "an innocent victim." The statement was strongly criticized by the Ukrainian ambassador to the Holy See Andrii Yurash and the Ukrainian Ministry of Foreign Affairs summoned the Apostolic Nuncio in Ukraine Archbishop Visvaldas Kulbokas for explanations on the issue. In a statement to Vatican News, the Holy See clarified that the Pope's words were to be interpreted as a defense of human life, not as a political defense of Dugina, noting that Francis has repeatedly condemned the Russian invasion of Ukraine.

In The Conversation, Matthew Sussex of Australian National University's National Security College wrote: "any way you cut it, the killing of Darya Dugina brings Putin's own leadership into question. This is something he has scrupulously avoided. He is obsessed with control, and enjoys the support of a massive propaganda machine to turn defeats into triumphs and blame others for his mistakes."

French magazine Éléments, organ of the ethno-nationalist think tank GRECE published a lengthy tribute to both. Ideologue Alain de Benoist called Dugina's death "an act of war."

 Funeral and burial 

On 23 August 2022, a farewell ceremony for Dugina was held at a TV studio in Moscow's Ostankino Tower, where she was lying in state; it was attended, among others, by far-right party leader Leonid Slutsky, propagandist Dmitry Kiselyov, and "Putin's chef," government and military contractor Yevgeny Prigozhin, leader of A Just Russia — For Truth Sergey Mironov, Deputy Chairman of the State Duma Sergey Neverov, National Bolshevik writer and activist Zakhar Prilepin, the head of the State television Rossiya Segodnya Dmitry Kiselyov, Governor of Khabarovsk Krai Mikhail Degtyarev, ultra-conservative oligarch Konstantin Malofeev and Vladimir Putin's representative Igor Shchyogolev. On the same day, the Russian President Vladimir Putin posthumously awarded her with the Order of Courage for "courage and selflessness shown in the performance of her professional duty."

After the funeral services, she was buried next to her grandmother in the village cemetery.

 Legacy  

Russian-language investigative news site Meduza'' argues that her death "helped her father, Alexander Dugin, rise from ultraconservative fringe philosopher to key Kremlin ideologue".

See also 
Eva Bartlett
List of deaths by car bombing
List of assassinations
Russian information war against Ukraine

References

External links 

 A portrait of Russian Daria Dugina, who was killed in a car bomb on Getty images

1992 births
2022 deaths
Assassinated activists
People murdered in Russia
Deaths by car bomb
Assassinated Russian journalists
Terrorism deaths in Russia
Journalists from Moscow
Moscow State University alumni
Russian journalists
Russian nationalists
Russian political activists
Russian political scientists
Russian women philosophers
Russian propagandists
Russian conspiracy theorists
Recipients of the Order of Courage
Russian individuals subject to European Union sanctions
Russian individuals subject to the U.S. Department of the Treasury sanctions
Russian individuals subject to United Kingdom sanctions
Specially Designated Nationals and Blocked Persons List
Anti-Ukrainian sentiment in Russia